Aspen Valley, California is an unincorporated community in Tuolumne County, California. It is located in the western part of Yosemite National Park, about 8 miles southeast of Mather.

It was the nearest community to the Crane Flat Fire Lookout, which is listed on the National Register of Historic Places.

References

Unincorporated communities in Tuolumne County, California
Yosemite National Park
Populated places in the Sierra Nevada (United States)
Unincorporated communities in California